Michael Stephenson, known professionally as Michael Paul Stephenson, is an American filmmaker and actor. He is known for directing the critically acclaimed documentaries Best Worst Movie and The American Scream. Michael made his narrative feature debut with Girlfriend’s Day, starring Bob Odenkirk. Michael's latest film, Attack of the Murder Hornets, is an original documentary that he directed and produced for Discovery+. He is a member of the Directors Guild of America.

Personal life 
Michael Paul Stephenson lives in Los Angeles with his producing-partner and wife.

Career

1983-2005: Early career 
Michael Paul Stephenson’s career in the entertainment industry started at the age of 8 when he was discovered by a talent agent while acting in his school’s rendition of Peter Pan. When he was 10 years old, he auditioned for the horror film, Troll 2, and got the starring role. Troll 2 was released in 1990 and is widely considered to be of exceptionally poor quality, and has come to be regarded by the public as one of the worst films ever made.

Michael continued professional acting into his early twenties appearing in various film and television productions. In 2005, he played "The Mummy" for Academy Award director Taika Waititi during a workshop of Eagle vs. Shark at the Sundance Film Institute. In this role, Michael was wrapped in toilet paper and set on fire by Taika Waititi. It was the last time Michael stepped in front of the camera as an actor.

Throughout his younger years, Michael spent most of his time writing stories and making skateboarding films. He has always been drawn to photography and is known to shoot on every film he makes. Early in his career, Michael worked with Oscar nominee Mel Stuart as a cinematographer. As a writer, Michael was a beneficiary of the American Gem Screenplay Award for his screenplay, Orange.

2009-present 
Michael Paul Stephenson co-founded a production company with his wife Lindsay Stephenson, Magic Stone productions, in 2009.

In 2009, Michael produced and directed the crowd pleasing and critically acclaimed, Best Worst Movie. a documentary about Troll 2 and its cult status. The film launched on March 14, 2009, at the Alamo Drafthouse South Lamar in Austin, Texas, as part of the South by Southwest film festival. Best Worst Movie won several awards and ABC's Nightline ran a segment on Troll 2 and Best Worst Movie in May 2010, including interviews with Hardy and Stephenson. On Rotten Tomatoes, Best Worst Movie holds an approval rating of 94%.

In 2012, Michael produced and directed his second feature documentary The American Scream for NBC Universal's Chiller network. The American Scream premiered on October 28, 2012, and was named a "Must Watch" by Entertainment Weekly. Michael Paul Stephenson is also the Executive Producer of Zero Charisma, a comedy directed by Katie Graham and editor Andrew Matthews. Zero Charisma won the audience award at the SXSW film festival in 2013.

In 2017, Michael Paul Stephenson made his narrative feature debut with the dark comedy Girlfriend’s Day, starring Bob Odenkirk. The film premiered worldwide on February 14 – Valentine's Day — on Netflix.

Michael Paul Stephenson’s most recent film, Attack of the Murder Hornets, is an original documentary that he produced and directed for Discovery+. The film was released worldwide on February 20, 2021 and has a 100% approval rating on Rotten Tomatoes.

Select filmography

As actor

As filmmaker

Critical reception 
Best Worst Movie was an official selection of the 2009 SXSW Film Festival. Best Worst Movie won Best Feature Documentary (as voted by the official jury), as well as the Audience Choice for Best Documentary Feature at the 11th annual Sidewalk Moving Picture Festival in September 2009. On Rotten Tomatoes, Best Worst Movie holds an approval rating of 94%.

The American Scream won the Best Picture award in Fantastic Fest 2012 in the category of Documentary Features. On Rotten Tomatoes, The American Scream holds an approval rating of 100% Zero Charisma and won the 2013 SXSW Film Festival Audience Award in the category of the narrative spotlight.

Girlfriend’s Day received mixed reviews from critics, where the review aggregator website Rotten Tomatoes, the film holds an approval rating of 43% with an average 5.5/10. Paste Magazine gave the film an 8.0 rating (out of 10).

Attack of The Murder Hornets holds an approval rating of 100% on Rotten Tomatoes.

References

External links
 

1978 births
Living people
American male child actors
American documentary filmmakers
American male film actors
American film directors
American film producers
American male television actors